Lima Maru was a 6,989-ton Japanese troop transport during World War II, which sank on 8 February 1944 with great loss of life.

The Lima Maru was built in 1920 by the Mitsubishi Zosen Kaisha in Nagasaki for the Nippon Yusen shipping company.

On 8 February 1944, as part of convoy MOTA-02, she was transporting around 2,900 men of the Japanese 19th Brigade from Moji to Takao. The Lima Maru was torpedoed and sunk by the US submarine  some 30 miles south east of the Goto Archipelago at position 31°05´N, 127°37´E. 
The Lima Maru exploded and sank very fast. Fewer than 150 soldiers survived.

See also 
 List by death toll of ships sunk by submarines
 List of battles and other violent events by death toll

References

World War II merchant ships of Japan
Ships sunk by American submarines
Maritime incidents in February 1944
Ships built by Mitsubishi Heavy Industries
1920 ships
World War II shipwrecks in the East China Sea